Combat is grid-based and occurs in real-time. Holiday starts with a single melee and ranged attack, with successful hits building up a power bar that unlocks a special attack. The opponent will utilize one of several melee or ranged attacks. Both opponents can move within the grid, though Holiday is restricted to the first 2 rows. Completing combat awards experience points to Holiday which unlocks options within a talent tree.

In-combat special moves and particular events within the storyline trigger a quick time event, requiring the user to follow a shape on the screen in iOS, but in the upcoming Windows version it will be similar to the approach used in The Typing of the Dead.

Development
Production of Revolution 60 began in 2011, approximately a year after developer Brianna Wu met animator Amanda Stenquist-Warner through an advertisement on Craigslist. The initial version of the game was to be a top down turn-based strategy, along the lines of Final Fantasy Tactics, although Wu chose a change in direction to a 3D game after seeing Infinity Blade.

After briefly hiring contractors, Wu and Stenquist-Warner hired Maria Enderton as lead developer and technical artist, who had been a school friend of Warner's. Wu's husband Frank provided designs for the spaceships (including the armored transport Xiezhi, the Dragonchild fighter ship, and the Death Lotus capital ship) as well as the space station N313. Jenna Hoffstein, a freelance developer, designed the combat system from the ground up. Ex-Harmonix employee Carolyn VanEseltine refined the combat system, upgrade system, and overall difficulty curve.

During development, Wu provided a development diary, initially through App.net then through her Twitter account. She would outline difficulties faced such as designing a talent tree suitable for seasoned gamers and newcomers. Not wanting to alienate core parts of the market, VanEseltine organized a testing pool of players in order to best represent their intended market, equally splitting "self-described gamers" with casual gamers and between men and women.  Wu said some men in the test group were "very antagonistic and negative toward choices and tweaks that made the game inclusive to everyone else".

In July 2013, the company ran a Kickstarter campaign, asking for $5,000 to port the game to PC and Mac, in addition to iOS. The fundraiser brought in $12,728. Wu acknowledged her dislike of microtransactions, and wanted the balance between a one-off cost yet still allowing players to try the game. Wu, who described the sci-fi themed action-adventure as "Heavy Rain meets Mass Effect", was credited as head of development. Wu described the art style as inspired by Space Channel 5 and Sailor Moon. Reflecting the almost all-female development team, the game features an all-female cast, which The Guardian noted is "a rarity on mobile platforms". Amanda Winn-Lee provided voice acting, after Wu had been impressed by her previous anime performances.

Wu developed characters that could be considered "attractive and strong," but didn't feel the need to make them "kid-safe or desexualized." Because of feminist criticism, Wu declared the characters' figures for the sequel to Revolution 60 would be more realistic, saying, "Having learned to draw from anime is not a great basis for running a studio that's held up as a poster child of feminism. To say it bluntly, I screwed up... I think we can do better portraying body types going forward."

In January 2015, Wu announced that the game would be on Steam Greenlight. She mentioned that the PC version would allow the player to type the emotions they experience from the game. The PC port was released on September 6, 2016.

Technical

Revolution 60 was developed on Unreal Engine 3 using UnrealScript, with Autodesk Maya used for animation before porting it into the Unreal Development Kit.

Due to a desire to include a rich storyline, emphasis was placed on character expression with more detail in the face and hair to avoid having to express emotion solely though "a bunch of gesticulation". While this allows for more emotion and communication in the cut-scenes a trade-off occurred due to hardware limitations, requiring less detail on the body of the game characters. This was the primary factor in the design decision to employ the "skin-tight suits".

The game was initially written around a film-style screenplay; however, based on feedback at PAX 2013, it was considered overly-reliant on long cutscenes and was rebuilt around continuous interaction.

Reception
Game critics on review aggregator Metacritic gave "mixed or average reviews" for a combined score of 73/100 based on eight reviews. On game review site GameRankings the game has a 71.67% rating based on six reviews. Macworld praised the game, calling it "the most ambitious iOS game you'll play this year". Kotakus review was also positive, remarking, "as the credits rolled for Revolution 60... I felt the familiar pang of loss I feel whenever a great game ends." RPGFan called the game "an absolute winner". iMore listed it as the "iOS Action Game of the Year" in 2014, saying that "the modeling is gorgeous, the animation delightful, the music engrossing, and the voice acting outstanding".

Response from other outlets were also more mixed. TouchArcade praised the plot, but argued the game "[failed] to deliver in terms of gameplay". Pocket Gamer said that the gameplay was "variable", adding that it can have an odd effect on the pacing of the game. Paste called it "an interesting, if underwhelming, melange of elements you'd be hard-pressed to find in another game, let alone one on a mobile platform." However, ratings on Steam were Mostly Negative with an aggregate rating of 23% from 46 reviews. Common complaints about the game included those about gameplay, level design, graphics and even the story.

Sequel
Giant Spacekat has stated there will be a sequel titled Revolution 62, where many of the original characters will reappear. Wu stated that Giant Spacekat would be attempting to recruit Felicia Day in a voice acting role for a main character. The sequel is planned to use the Unreal 4 engine so there would be a high likelihood of an Android port. A male Chinese-American character called Chase is also slated to appear in the sequel. No updates have been issued on the status of Revolution 62 since 2015.

References

External links

 
 
 Revolution Raver interview with Frank Wu

2014 video games
Adventure games
Indie video games
IOS games
Kickstarter-funded video games
Crowdfunded video games
MacOS games
Unreal Engine games
Video games developed in the United States
Video games featuring female protagonists
Windows games